{{DISPLAYTITLE:C2H4Cl2O}}
The molecular formula C2H4Cl2O (molar mass: 114.96 g/mol, exact mass: 113.9639 u) may refer to:

 Bis(chloromethyl) ether
 Dichloromethyl methyl ether